Gisborne High School may refer to:

In Gisborne, New Zealand:
Gisborne Boys' High School 
Gisborne Girls' High School